is an interactive board game for the Nintendo 64 loosely based on The Game of Life. It was released only in Japan in 1998.

References 

1998 video games
Japan-exclusive video games
Nintendo 64 games
Nintendo 64-only games
Taito games
Video games based on board games
Video games developed in Japan